Sturdie Wayman Downs (born 1947) was consecrated as Anglican bishop on 9 February 1985.  He is Bishop of Nicaragua and served from 2015 to 2019 as Archbishop of the Anglican Church in Central America (Iglesia Anglicana de la Region Central de America/IARCA).

References

External links 
IARCA listing
Episcopal Church biography
Sturdie Wyman Downs installed as primate for Central America

1947 births
Living people
Bishops of the Episcopal Church (United States)
Anglican bishops of Nicaragua
Anglican archbishops of Central America